13 Demon Street is a horror anthology TV series that aired between 1959 and 1960 in American syndication. Thirteen 25-minute episodes were produced in Sweden, although the language, and cast, is English.

Lon Chaney Jr. was the host, introducing each episode from his 'home' at 13 Demon Street. Condemned for some shockingly atrocious crime, Chaney's purpose in relating the series' stories was to convince viewers that the crimes presented in them were worse than his, thus freeing him from his purgatory. This was hard for audiences to judge, however, because Chaney's original crime was never specified.

The series was originated by Curt Siodmak, who also wrote some of the scripts and directed several episodes. He had previously written Chaney's 1941 film The Wolf Man.

Three episodes of the series were edited together to make a theatrical feature called The Devil's Messenger in 1961, in which Chaney's character was reconfigured as Satan himself. Chaney filmed new wraparound segments as Satan in Hell to link the chosen episodes, which were "The Photograph", "The Girl in the Glacier" and "Condemned in Crystal".

Several of the show's stories were derivative in nature. "The Black Hand", for example, was modelled on The Hands of Orlac, while "The Photograph" is an updated version of the M R James story "The Mezzotint".

Availability on home video
The series is available on grey market home video. In addition, two episodes - 'The Vine of Death' and 'The Black Hand' - were included as bonus features on the Image DVD release of the 1958 Hal Roach/ Boris Karloff series The Veil. Odeon's UK release of the same series featured four - the Image episodes, plus 'The Photograph' and 'Fever'. The episode "The Girl in the Glacier" was included on the DVD of Terror in the Midnight Sun.

Although numerous dealers offer the series on DVD or VHS, every existing set is missing most of the Lon Chaney footage, removed by some unknown individual for unknown reasons.  Episodes were intended to open and close in Lon Chaney's character's dilapidated home, where he would act as host and comment on each individual story.  However, most episodes have obvious jump cuts, almost completely eliminating Lon Chaney's presence.

Cast
Alan Blair  (3 episodes)
Hilda Bruce-Potter  (3 episodes)
Sydney Coulson (3 episodes)
Jason Lindsay  (3 episodes)
Charles Nolte  (3 episodes)
Lori Scott  (3 episodes)
Ben Bennett  (2 episodes)
Ralph Brown  (2 episodes)
Pat Clavin  (2 episodes)
John Crawford  (2 episodes)
Doreen Denning  (2 episodes)
Jill Donohue  (2 episodes)
Lauritz Falk  (2 episodes)
Michael Hinn ...  Fay (2 episodes)
Robert Kanter  (2 episodes)
Robert St. Clair ...  Man (2 episodes)
Torsten Lilliecrona (as Tor Steen)  (2 episodes)
Vernon Young  (2 episodes)

List of episodes
"The Black Hand" (written by Richard Jairus Castle, story by Curt Siodmak)
"Fever"
"Condemned in Crystal"
"Green are the Leaves"
"The Girl in the Glacier"
"The Book of Ghouls"
"The Photograph"
"The Vine of Death" (written by Curt Siodmak and Leo Guild)
"A Gift of Murder"
"The Secret of the Telescope"
"Never Steal a Warlock's Wife"
"Murder in the Mirror"
"Black Nemesis"

Cultural references
The name of the Swedish hardcore punk band D.S.-13 is a play on that of the series.

References

External links
 
 https://archive.org/search.php?query=subject%3A%2213+Demon+Street%22

1950s Swedish television series
1960s Swedish television series
1959 Swedish television series debuts
1960 Swedish television series endings
1950s American anthology television series
1960s American anthology television series
1950s American horror television series
1960s American horror television series
1959 American television series debuts
1960 American television series endings
Swedish drama television series
Works by Curt Siodmak
English-language television shows
First-run syndicated television programs in the United States
Fiction about purgatory